Grace McDaniels (March 14, 1888 – March 17, 1958) was a freak show star known as the "Mule-Faced Woman" due to a severe facial deformity known as Sturge–Weber syndrome. She joined Harry Lewiston's Traveling Circus, where she was paid $175 per week.

Life

McDaniels was born on a farm in 1888, near the small town of Numa, Iowa. Her parents were described as "perfectly normal" and had no facial irregularities. As a young child, she had difficulty speaking, but learned to speak more fluently in later years. After winning The Ugliest Woman contest in 1935, Grace joined Harry Lewiston's sideshow, traveling around the country and some parts of Canada. Although she embraced her disability, McDaniels never liked having her picture taken, because she felt that advertising herself would show a lack of self-respect.

McDaniels was married briefly in the 1930s. She had a son, Elmer and a daughter Stella four years later, who she called "her greatest treasure." Grace was described as an incredible mother who would go to great lengths to make her children happy. Elmer and Stella McDaniels served as her business managers and traveled with her until her death in 1958. McDaniels died of natural causes in between tours in Chicago, Illinois. She was buried in Gibsonton, Florida where her grave is a Florida landmark.

In popular culture

Grace McDaniels is mentioned in Tom Waits' song Lucky Day (Overture) from his album The Black Rider, about sideshow performers.

References

American circus performers
Ringling Bros. and Barnum & Bailey Circus
1888 births
1958 deaths
Sideshow performers
People from Appanoose County, Iowa
People from Gibsonton, Florida